Alwyn Walter "Walt" Peregoy (November 17, 1925 – January 16, 2015) was an American artist who was a color stylist and background artist for animated cartoons. Among the studios he worked for were Walt Disney Productions 1951–1964, 1974–1983, Format Films and Hanna-Barbera (1968–1971 & 1973).

He received little publicity over his career, but was acclaimed for his avant-garde style.  His dedication, creativity and contributions to animation while at Disney earned Peregoy the honor of being inducted into the Disney Legends roster in 2008.

Life

Early years

Peregoy was born in Los Angeles in 1925.  He spent his early childhood on a small island (Alameda, California) in San Francisco Bay.  He was nine years old when he began his formal art training by attending classes at the California College of Arts and Crafts in Berkeley, California. At the age 12 years old, Peregoy's family returned to Los Angeles, where he enrolled in Chouinard Art Institute's life drawing classes.  At the age 17 Peregoy dropped out of high school and went to work for Disney as an in-betweener.

In 1942, he joined the U.S. Coast Guard and served for three years in the Infirmary as a 1st Class Petty Officer.  After World War II he continued his art education, studying at the University de Belles Artes, San Miguel de Allende in Guanajuato, Mexico, and with Fernand Léger in Paris.

Animation work

In 1951, Peregoy returned to the United States and resumed his career with The Walt Disney Studios. Although skilled with these more conventional projects, Peregoy's personal style began to surface. Peregoy's unique style began to meshed well with that of his contemporary, stylist Eyvind Earle. Peregoy and Earle's work on Paul Bunyan (1958) was nominated for an Academy Award in the short category.  Their unique style of animation on Paul Bunyan was a departure for Disney. Peregoy continued to work at Disney for an additional 14 years.

Peregoy was lead background painter on Sleeping Beauty (1959) before embarking on the most ambitious, intelligent, and personal effort, his work as color stylist and background artist on One Hundred and One Dalmatians (1961), and The Sword in the Stone (1963). He later worked on Scooby-Doo, Where Are You! (1969), and other series produced by Hanna-Barbera.

He returned to Disney (WED Enterprises in 1977 through 1983), contributing his unique view to the design of Epcot Center in Florida, where his influence included architectural facades, sculptures, fountains, show rides, and murals for The Land and "Imagination!" (formerly The journey into  the Imagination) pavilions.

Along with Marc Davis, Eyvind Earle and Joshua Meador, Peregoy was one of the featured artists in Disney's Four Artists Paint One Tree documentary.  This documentary illustrated the unique interpretation that each artist can bring to a single subject matter.

Peregoy's work has been the subject of one Man Shows at: Stockton Museum, California; The University of Santa Clara, California; Galerie de Tour, San Francisco, California; Rutherford Gallery, San Francisco, California; Chouinard Art Institute, Los Angeles, California; Landau Gallery, Los Angeles, California; Dickie Hall Gallery, Laguna, California; Jack Carr Gallery, Pasadena, California.  He has also participated in group shows at: National Gallery of Art, the Library of Congress and the Corcoran Gallery of Art in Washington, D.C.

Later years

He taught Background Styling at Brandes Art Institute from 1984–1985 as well as Principle of Drawing.  In the last years of his life, he continued to draw and paint in the Los Angeles area.

Peregoy died on January 16, 2015, at the age of 89.

External links

2005 Golden Award: Walt Peregoy
2008 Disney Legends Award: Walt Peregoy
Walt Peregoy, ’101 Dalmatians’ Color Stylist, RIP
Obituary - Los Angeles Times

1925 births
2015 deaths
American artists
Background artists
Walt Disney Animation Studios people
Hanna-Barbera people